Grampus-kun is a mascot of Nagoya Grampus, a Japanese association football club in the J-League.
Grampus-kun is an artificial grampus dolphin. He has a wife, a son and a daughter. He has also became friends with Pul, the mascot of Shimizu S-Pulse. They both have even released a book together about them going out for lunch, interviewing each other, introducing themselves, and talking about their home towns.

Grampus family

Grampus-kun 
body color:  black
height:  188 sm (shachi-meters)
weight:  88 sg (shachi-grams)
birthday: October 3
birthplace: Aichi prefecture (Chuubu area)
hobbies: watching sports and traveling

Grampako-chan 
body color:  black
height:  178 sm (shachi-meters)
weight:  100 sg (shachi-grams)
birthday: May 14
relation: wife
nickname: Pako-chan

Grampus-kun Jr. 
body color:  black
height: 168 sm (shachi-meters)
weight:  68 sg (shachi-grams)
birthday: August 8
relation: son
hobbies: mixed martial arts

Grara 
body color:  red
height:  secret
weight:  secret
birthday: March 22
relation: daughter
hobby:  dancing
favorite food:  strawberry

See also
List of J. League mascots

References

External links
 
mascot information (マスコット情報) (Japanese)

Nagoya Grampus